"Long Gone" is a song by New Zealand band Six60, released as the fifth single from their third album Six60 in March 2020.

Background and composition

The song's instruments are primarily samples of taonga pūoro (traditional Māori instruments). The samples were taken from an album by Hinewehi Mohi, which the song's producer Malay used as a basis for the track. Six60's lead singer Matiu Walters felt the song was one of his favourite tracks from the band's third album, describing it as "sound[ing] exactly like where we are right now."

The song was written in Los Angeles in collaboration with New Zealand songwriter Leroy Clampitt, also known as Big Taste. "Long Gone" was written as a break-up song, and only took minutes to be written.

Release and promotion 

The song was released as a single at the end of their 2021 summer tour of New Zealand. During the release of the band's third album Six60 in November 2019, the group performed the song live for the radio station ZM.

Credits and personnel
Credits adapted from Tidal.

Wally Arowora – background vocalist
Big Taste – production, songwriting
E. Kidd Bogart – songwriting
Matt Chamberlain – drums
Jon DeCuir – background vocalist
Shameka Dwight – background vocalist
Ji Fraser – guitar
Chris Galland – mixing engineer
Marlon Gerbes – guitar, keyboards songwriting
Aja Grant – background vocalist
Romaine Jones – background vocalist
Candace Lacy – background vocalist
Judah Lacy – background vocalist
Precious Lacy – background vocalist
Chris Mac – bass guitar
Malay – production, songwriting
Manny Marroquin – mixer
Eli Paewai – drums
Keisha Renee – background vocalist
Alex Threat-Arowora – background vocalist
Matiu Walters – songwriting, vocals

Charts

Year-end charts

Certifications

References

2020 singles
2019 songs
New Zealand pop songs
Six60 songs
Songs written by Malay (record producer)
Songs written by E. Kidd Bogart